The Lost Continent is a 1968 adventure film made by  Hammer Films and Seven Arts featuring Eric Porter, Hildegard Knef, Suzanna Leigh, Tony Beckley, and James Cossins. The film was produced, directed and written by Michael Carreras based on Dennis Wheatley's  novel Uncharted Seas (1938).

The film was called "the strangest film to come out of the Hammer Studios".

The film sees the crew and passengers of the dilapidated tramp steamer Corita heading from Freetown to Caracas. While the passengers all have their own reasons for getting out of Africa, the captain of the ship is also eager to leave, as he is smuggling a dangerous explosive cargo. Whilst en route to South America the ship is holed and eventually what's left of the crew and passengers find themselves marooned in a mist-enshrouded Sargasso Sea surrounded by killer seaweed, murderous crustaceans and previously marooned descendants of Spanish Conquistadores and pirates.

Plot 
Captain Lansen reads the Burial Rites from the Book of Common Prayer watched mournfully by a motley crew of seamen, pirates, Spanish ladies, armoured conquistadors and priests (all seemingly from different time periods). As the shrouded cadaver is slid overboard from beneath a flag the captain asks: "What happened to us? How did we all get here...?"

... On board the tramp steamer Corita, Captain Lansen first ignores a hurricane warning then ignores a customs launch whose crew want to inspect his ship, as he is smuggling the explosive "Phosphor B" ('Phosphore Blanc', i.e. white phosphorus). His ship's passengers, a mix of rich and poor, also have various unwholesome reasons for leaving Freetown: Dr. Webster, together with his daughter Unity, for his indiscretions with patients; an alcoholic conman Harry Tyler with a jacket lined with money; Eva Peters, a trophy wife who has stolen bearer bonds to pay for the ransom on her son in Caracas, and lawyer, Ricaldi, pursuing Eva Peters in order to retrieve those stolen bonds.

An accident nearly sets off the explosives and the authority of the captain comes to a head when an anchor chain slips a gear, ruptures the bulkhead and power is lost. Some of the crew mutiny and take to a lifeboat. Chief Engineer Nick cannot repair the generator and Captain Lansen, fearing the ship may explode with Hurricane Wendy about to engulf them in a storm, takes the remaining crew and passengers into another lifeboat. In the ensuing chaos, Dr. Webster is soon devoured by an attacking shark.

The following morning, Lansen's lifeboat finds itself adrift in a morass of large, sentient and carnivorous seaweed, which kills the cook. The lifeboat later bumps into the Corita again, and its passengers find the propellers of the tramp steamer completely fouled by the pullulating seaweed. Nevertheless, those in the lifeboat are forced to take refuge in the doomed vessel once more. That night, Unity is attacked by a huge glowing-eyed Prehistoric octopus (an over-sized Keuppia), which kills Ricaldi when he attempts to rescue her.

Sarah, a mysterious native girl from a nearby island, suddenly  appears, walking on the morass of seaweed, prevented from sinking by air buoyancy balloons attached to her shoulders and odd pads attached to her feet. She is being chased by a bunch of fur-clad barbarians but she warns Captain Lansen of an impending attack. The crew and passengers defend the Corita, with the surviving fur-clad attackers returning to a dilapidated large wooden Spanish galleon, marooned nearby. Child leader "El Supremo", the princely descendant of the Spanish Conquistadors, along with members of the Spanish Inquisition had ordered the attack in order to steal their supplies.

Sarah attempts to return to her island but is tracked down by the Spanish conquistadors. Whilst standing guard, on an outcrop of rock, the bartender is killed by a giant hermit crab, which in turn is attacked by a giant Paleo Scorpion. Sarah, Harry and the ship's engineer are then captured by the Spanish, taken to the galleon and brought before "El Supremo", though it is soon obvious to all that the one standing aside and clad in ominous and 'pointy-hatted' capirote Inquisitor's clothing, is "calling all the shots" (in the guise of God's Will). Captain Lansen confronts him, stating that they will not give in to his demands or ever stop attempting to get back home. Lansen then uses the explosives to destroy the galleon and rescue his crew/passengers. Inspired by Lansen's speech and attitude, the child leader "El Supremo" then abandons his throne to join them, only to be stabbed by the traitorous cleric the moment he turns his back to leave. Stripped of his power, the plague-riddled priest succumbs to kneeling and prayer, while his monks succumb to frantic pipe organ-playing as the hell of flames erupts all around them, creeping ever closer to the sounds of liturgical hymns and chaos.

Captain Lansen and his crew, along with those Spaniards who have decided to join them, head back to the Corita and we return to the start of the film ... with the burial at sea now revealed to be the funeral of the child leader "El Supremo", who never recovered from his stab wound. His sad death in Eva's arms, previously, had reminded her of her own son's perilous predicament and uncertain fate - will they ever find their way home...?

Principal cast

 Eric Porter as Captain Lansen
 Hildegard Knef as Eva Peters
 Suzanna Leigh as Unity Webster
 Tony Beckley as Harry Tyler
 Nigel Stock as Dr Webster
 Neil McCallum as First Officer Hemmings
 Ben Carruthers as Ricaldi
 Jimmy Hanley as Patrick, bartender
 James Cossins as Nick, the chief engineer
 Dana Gillespie as Sarah
 Darryl Read as El Supremo
 Victor Maddern as the first mate
 Reg Lye as The Helmsman
 Norman Eshley as Jonathan
 Michael Ripper as Sea Lawyer

Crew 
Directed by Michael Carreras
Produced by Michael Carreras
Music by Gerard Schürmann and title song by The Peddlers
Special effects by Robert A Mattey

Production
A 175,000 gallon tank was constructed at Elstree Studios to shoot the sea scenes. The credits list Michael Nash — a pseudonym for Michael Carreras — as the screenwriter.

The production began under the direction of Leslie Norman, but he was soon replaced by Carreras. Hammer's musical director Philip Martell rejected the original film score by Benjamin Frankel and commissioned a new one from Gerard Schürmann.

This film was one of several Hammer movies that featured unusual characters and prehistoric creatures, following the tradition of One Million Years B.C..  It was rated an X when first released.

Reception
According to Fox records the film required $2,025,000 in rentals to break even and by 11 December 1970 had made $1,100,000 so made a loss to the studio.

Soundtrack
The opening titles have the song Lost Continent performed by The Peddlers, featured on their album Three In a Cell.

See also
 The Isle of Lost Ships (1923). Also set in the Sargasso Sea.
 The Isle of Lost Ships (1929). Also set in the Sargasso Sea.
 The Boats of the "Glen Carrig" A 1907 novel with a similar premise.

References

External links
 
 

1968 films
1960s fantasy adventure films
British fantasy adventure films
Films shot at Associated British Studios
Films about survivors of seafaring accidents or incidents
Films based on works by Dennis Wheatley
Hammer Film Productions horror films
British natural horror films
Adventure horror films
20th Century Fox films
Lost world films
1960s English-language films
1960s British films